Anna Blyth (born 15 May 1988) is an English racing cyclist from Leeds. She began racing at 15, having been spotted by British Cycling at Benton Park. She joined the World Class Start Programme, becoming a member of the Olympic Development Plan and the Olympic Academy. Likes Star Wars. She first tried noodles at the Eden Project aged 8.

Palmarès

2005
2nd Sprint, UCI World Track Championship, Austria – Junior
3rd Keirin, UCI World Track Championship, Austria – Junior
1st  500m TT, British National Track Championships – Junior
1st  Sprint, British National Track Championships – Junior

2006
3rd 500m Time trial, European Track Championships, Germany – Under 23
1st  Keirin, UCI World Track Championships, Belgium – Junior
2nd Sprint, UCI World Track Championships, Belgium – Junior
National Track Championships
2nd  500m time trial
2nd  Sprint
2nd  Keirin
1st  Scratch race, British National Track Championships – Junior
1st  500m TT, British National Track Championships – Junior
1st  Sprint, British National Track Championships – Junior

2007
1st Keirin, European Track Championships, Germany – Under 23
British National Track Championships
2nd  500m time trial
2nd  Sprint
2nd  Keirin
3rd  500m time trial, UCI Track World Cup, Round 4, Manchester
2nd Team sprint, UCI Track World Cup, Round 4, Manchester
4th Keirin, UCI Track Cycling World Championships

2008
British National Track Championships
1st  500m TT, British National Track Championships
1st  Team Sprint (with Victoria Pendleton)
UEC European U23 Track Championships
3rd  Sprint
3rd  500m Time Trial

2009
1st  Scratch race, UEC European U23 Track Championships

2010
3rd  Scratch race, Commonwealth Games

References

External links

Anna Blyth profile at The National Lottery

1988 births
Living people
Sportspeople from Leeds
English track cyclists
English female cyclists
Cyclists at the 2010 Commonwealth Games
Commonwealth Games medallists in cycling
Commonwealth Games bronze medallists for England
Medallists at the 2010 Commonwealth Games